Harry or Henry Kelley may refer to:
Harry Kelley (rower) (1832–1914), British oarsman on the Thames
Harry Kelley (baseball) (1906–1958), Major League Baseball pitcher
Henry J. Kelley (1926–1988), professor of aeronautical engineering

See also
Harry Kelly (disambiguation)
Harold Kelley (disambiguation)